Jean-Baptiste Simmenauer (born 19 November 2000) is a French racing driver. He is the current champion of the GT World Challenge Europe Endurance Cup in the Silver Cup category, a title he achieved alongside Benjamin Goethe and Thomas Neubauer, driving for ROFGO Racing with Team WRT.

Career

Karting
Simmenauer first began karting in 2012 with Italian team Tony Kart. In 2015, he claimed the title in the French Karting Championship.

Toyota Racing Series
In December 2016, it was announced Simmenauer would make his debut in single-seaters in the Toyota Racing Series, replacing reigning champion Lando Norris, following the latter's decision not to defend his title.

Formula Renault 2.0
In January 2017, Simmenauer joined JD Motorsport for the Formula Renault Eurocup. He went on to experience a disappointing campaign, failing to score points in a season he would end 27th in the standings.

Porsche Carrera Cup

Simmenauer switched to sportscar racing in 2018, driving for Lechner Racing in the Porsche Carrera Cup Germany.

GT World Challenge 
For the 2022 season, Simmenauer joined Team WRT to compete in the GT World Challenge Europe Sprint Cup alongside Christopher Mies, whilst partnering Benjamin Goethe and Thomas Neubauer in the Silver Cup of the GT World Challenge Europe Endurance Cup. Notable success would come in the latter, as the Frenchman won three races in his category, which included the 24 Hours of Spa, which meant that Simmenauer and his teammates were crowned Silver Cup champions with one round to spare. Despite WRT's manufacturer change to BMW ahead of 2023, Simmenauer returned to the team. He partnered 2022 Endurance Cup co-driver Neubauer in the Pro class of the Sprint Cup, and joined Calan Williams and Niklas Krütten in the Endurance Cup.

Racing record

Career summary

† As Simmenauer was a guest driver, he was ineligible for points.
* Season still in progress.

Complete Formula Renault Eurocup results
(key) (Races in bold indicate pole position) (Races in italics indicate fastest lap)

Complete Porsche Supercup results
(key) (Races in bold indicate pole position) (Races in italics indicate fastest lap)

† As Simmenauer was a guest driver, he was ineligible to score points.

Complete GT World Challenge Europe Endurance Cup results
(Races in bold indicate pole position) (Races in italics indicate fastest lap)

Complete GT World Challenge Europe Sprint Cup results
(key) (Races in bold indicate pole position) (Races in italics indicate fastest lap)

References

External links
 

2000 births
Living people
French racing drivers
Toyota Racing Series drivers
Formula Renault Eurocup drivers
Formula Renault 2.0 NEC drivers
NASCAR drivers
Porsche Supercup drivers
JD Motorsport drivers
M2 Competition drivers
Walter Lechner Racing drivers
W Racing Team drivers
Karting World Championship drivers
Audi Sport drivers
24H Series drivers
Porsche Carrera Cup Germany drivers